Sorrell v. IMS Health Inc., 564 U.S. 552 (2011), is a United States Supreme Court case in which the Court held that a Vermont statute that restricted the sale, disclosure, and use of records that revealed the prescribing practices of individual doctors violated the First Amendment.

Background
In 2007, Vermont passed the Prescription Confidentiality Law that required, among other things, that records containing a doctor's prescribing practices not be sold or used for marketing purposes unless the doctor consented. The law was a response to a Vermont Medical Society resolution stating that using the prescribing history of doctors in marketing was an intrusion into the way doctors practice medicine. The Vermont Medical Society had found that the marketing efforts of pharmaceutical companies used in large part the data of individual doctors' prescribing patterns, sold to the companies by pharmacies without the doctors' consent and successfully lobbied the Vermont legislature to enact the law.

Data mining companies and pharmaceutical manufactures contended that the law violated their First Amendment rights and sought declaratory and injunctive relief against Vermont officials.  The United States District Court for the District of Vermont denied relief; the plaintiffs appealed to the United States Court of Appeals for the Second Circuit which reversed, holding that the law violated the First Amendment by restricting the speech of the companies without adequate justification. Vermont's Attorney General appealed to the Supreme Court, which granted certiorari to resolve the contradiction of a ruling of the United States Court of Appeals for the First Circuit, which had upheld similar laws in New Hampshire and Maine, concluding that the laws regulated economic conduct, not commercial speech.

Opinion

Associate Justice Anthony Kennedy delivered the opinion of the Court, which Chief Justice Roberts, Justice Scalia, Justice Thomas, Justice Alito, and Justice Sotomayor joined. The Court held that the law violated the First Amendment and affirmed the judgment of the Court of Appeals.

The first finding of the Court was that the law placed content and speaker based restrictions on speech.  Citing Cincinnati v. Discovery Network, Inc., the Court noted that these restrictions warranted heightened judicial scrutiny.

The Court rejected Vermont's argument that the law was only a commercial regulation and not a regulation of speech on the grounds that the law imposed more than an incidental burden on speech.

The second and final finding of the Court was that Vermont did not meet its burden to justify its content-based law as consistent with the First Amendment. According to Board of Trustees, State Univ. of N. Y. v. Fox, Vermont must demonstrate that the law directly advances a substantial government interest.  The Court rejected Vermont's claims that the law was necessary to protect medical privacy and achieve improved public healthcare.

Dissent

Associate Justice Stephen Breyer wrote a dissenting opinion, which Justice Ginsburg and Justice Kagan joined.  Breyer argued that the law should be reviewed as an economic regulation, not under a heightened standard applied for First Amendment issues. Breyer found that the legitimate regulatory objectives outweighed the small harm done to First Amendment interests.  Breyer also noted that applying a strict First Amendment standard whenever a legislative program burdened speech would give judges the power to choose to undermine or support legislative efforts.

Notes

References

External links

 Case page from SCOTUSblog

2011 in United States case law
United States Free Speech Clause case law
Overbreadth case law
United States Supreme Court cases
United States Supreme Court cases of the Roberts Court